Diodochus is the Latinized form of diadochos (“heir, successor”). It can refer to:

Personal name
 Marcus Diadochus, 4th-century Christian writer
 Diadochos of Photiki, 5th-century Christian saint
 Proclus Diadochus, 5th-century Neoplatonic philosopher

Scientific names
 Marginella diadochus, a species of Marginellid sea snail
 Diadochite, a mineral
 Diadochokinesia, the ability to make antagonistic movements in quick succession
Dysdiadokokinesia and adiadokokinesia, the medical terms for impaired or absent ability to make rapid alternating movements  

Other
 Diadochi, successors of Alexander the Great
 Wars of the Diadochi
 Diadochoupolis, a city in Mesopotamia
 Diadochos, the title of the Crown Prince of Greece

See also
 Successor (disambiguation)
 Epigonus (disambiguation)